Steriphopus macleayi is a species of spider of the genus Steriphopus. It is endemic to Sri Lanka.

See also
 List of Palpimanidae species

References

Endemic fauna of Sri Lanka
Spiders of Asia
Spiders described in 1873
Palpimanidae